Dolgerdd is a hamlet in the  community of Llandysiliogogo, Ceredigion, Wales, which is 65.6 miles (105.5 km) from Cardiff and 183.2 miles (294.8 km) from London. Dolgerdd is represented in the Senedd by Elin Jones (Plaid Cymru) and is part of the Ceredigion constituency in the House of Commons.

Etymology
The name derives from the Welsh language: "the meadow of music".

References

See also
List of localities in Wales by population

Villages in Ceredigion